The following is the list of squads that took place in the men's field hockey tournament at the 1964 Summer Olympics.

Group A

Australia
The following players represented Australia:

 John McBryde
 Desmond Piper
 Mervyn Crossman
 Paul Dearing
 Ray Evans
 Brian Glencross
 Robin Hodder
 Don McWatters
 Patrick Nilan
 Eric Pearce
 Julian Pearce
 Donald Smart
 Graham Wood
 Tony Waters
 Don Martin

Great Britain
The following players represented Great Britain:

 Paul Fishwick
 John Neill
 David Judge
 David Wilman
 Charles Jones
 Roger Sutton
 Howard Davis
 Alan Page
 Jim Deegan
 John Cadman
 John Hindle
 Christopher Langhorne
 David Veit
 Geoffrey Cutter
 Michael Corby
 Derek Miller
 John Land
 Harry Cahill

Japan
The following players represented Japan:

 Hiroshi Miwa
 Tsuneya Yuzaki
 Akio Takashima
 Shigeo Kaoku
 Kunio Iwahashi
 Toshihiko Yamaoka
 Kenji Takizawa
 Junichi Yamaguchi
 Hiroshi Tanaka
 Michio Okabe
 Seiji Kihara
 Katsuhiro Yuzaki
 Tetsuya Wakabayashi

Kenya
The following players represented Kenya:

 Saude George
 Anthony Vaz
 Avtar Singh Sohal
 Santokh Singh Matharu
 Surjeet Singh Panesar
 Silvester Fernandes
 Hilary Fernandes
 Edgar Fernandes
 Egbert Fernandes
 Reynold D'Souza
 Alu Mendonca
 John Simonian
 Krishnan Kumar Aggarwal
 Amar Singh Mangat
 Leo Fernandes
 Tejparkash Singh Brar

New Zealand
The following players represented New Zealand:

 Bill Schaefer
 Alan Patterson
 Ian Kerr
 Timothy Carter
 Ross Gillespie
 John Cullen
 Ernest Barnes
 Bruce Judge
 Brian Maunsell
 John Anslow
 Grantley Judge
 Peter Byers
 Phil Bygrave
 Trevor Blake

Pakistan
The following players represented Pakistan:

 Munir Ahmed Dar
 Manzoor Hussain Atif
 Saeed Anwar
 Anwar Ahmed Khan
 Abdul Rashid
 Khalid Mahmood
 Khawaja Zaka-ud-Din
 Khurshid Azam
 Muhammad Asad Malik
 Motiullah
 Abdul Hamid
 Tariq Aziz
 Zafar Hayat
 Tariq Niazi
 Muhammad Afzal Manna
 Nawaz Khizar Bajwa

Rhodesia
The following players represented Rhodesia:

 Dereck Brain
 Beverly Faulds
 Kevin van Blomestein
 John McPhun
 William Turpin
 Tinker Beets
 Ian Mackay
 Roy Barbour
 Lloyd Koch
 Anthony Charles "Tony" Unger
 Robert Robertson
 Robert Ullyett
 Des Tomlinson
 Ronald Spence
 Graham Cumming

Group B

Belgium
The following players represented Belgium:

 Michel Berger
 Jacques Vanderstappen
 Daniel Moussiaux
 Jacques Rémy
 Jean-Louis le Clerc
 Yves Bernaert
 Guy Miserque
 Claude Ravinet
 André Muschs
 Guy Verhoeven
 Jean-Louis Roersch
 Jean-Marie Buisset
 Franz Lorette
 Michel Muschs
 Freddy Rens
 Eric Van Beuren

Canada
The following players represented Canada:

 Ron Aldridge
 Victor Warren
 Lee Wright
 Tony Boyd
 John Young
 Ian Johnston
 Patrick Ruttle
 Peter Buckland
 Richard Chopping
 Derrick Anderson
 Allan Raphael
 Gerard Ronan
 Peter Vander Pyl
 Harry Preston

Hong Kong
The following players represented Hong Kong:

 Slawee Kadir
 Harnam Singh Grewal
 Farid Khan
 Eric McCosh
 Bosco da Silva
 Rui da Silva
 Kuldip Singh Gosal
 Omar Dallah
 Daniel Castro
 Packey Gardner
 Lionel Guterres
 Johnny Monteiro
 Kader Rahman
 Jock Collaquo
 Sarinder Singh Dillon
 Zia Hussain
 Zeca Cunha

India
The following players represented India:

 Shankar Laxman
 Gurbux Singh
 Dharam Singh
 Mohinder Lal
 Charanjit Singh
 Gindi Singh
 Hari Pal Kaushik
 Harbinder Singh
 Udham Singh
 Darshan Singh
 Prithipal Singh
 Bandu Patil
 V. J. Peter
 Jagjit Singh
 Syed Mushtaq Ali
 Rajendran Christie

Malaysia
The following players represented Malaysia:

 Ho Koh Chye
 Kandiah Anandarajah
 Manikam Shanmuganathan
 Michael Arulraj
 Doraisamy Munusamy
 Lawrence Van Huizen
 Douglas Nonis
 Chelliah Paramalingam
 Tara Singh Sindhu
 Koh Hock Seng
 Rajaratnam Yogeswaran
 Arumugam Sabapathy
 Ranjit Singh Gurdit
 Kunaratnam Alagaratnam

Netherlands
The following players represented the Netherlands:

 Joost Boks
 Charles Coster van Voorhout
 John Elffers
 Frans Fiolet
 Jan Piet Fokker
 Jan van Gooswilligen
 Francis van 't Hooft
 Arie de Keyzer
 Leendert Krol
 Jaap Leemhuis
 Chris Mijnarends
 Erik van Rossem
 Nico Spits
 Theo Terlingen
 Jan Veentjer
 Jaap Voigt
 Theo van Vroonhoven
 Frank Zweerts

Spain
The following players represented Spain:

 Carlos del Coso
 José Colomer
 Julio Solaun
 Juan Ángel Calzado
 José Antonio Dinarés
 Narciso Ventalló
 Ignacio Macaya
 Jaime Amat
 Francisco Amat
 Eduardo Dualde
 Jorge Vidal
 Luis María Usoz
 Pedro Amat
 Jaime Echevarría

United Team of Germany
The following players represented the United Team of Germany:

 Rainer Stephan
 Axel Thieme
 Klaus Vetter
 Horst Brennecke
 Klaus Bahner
 Horst Dahmlos
 Lothar Lippert
 Rolf Westphal
 Karl-Heinz Freiberger
 Dieter Ehrlich
 Adolf Krause
 Reiner Hanschke

References

1964

Squads